Cornips is a genus of moths belonging to the family Tortricidae.

Species
Cornips agelasta (Bradley, 1965)
Cornips dryocausta (Meyrick, 1938)
Cornips gravidspinatus Razowski, 2010

See also
List of Tortricidae genera

References

Archipini
Tortricidae